A by-election was held for the New South Wales Legislative Assembly electorate of Paddington on 26 July 1919 because of the death of Lawrence O'Hara who had been elected just  days previously in the May 1919 Paddington by-election.

Dates

Result

The by-election was caused by the death of Lawrence O'Hara.

See also
Electoral results for the district of Paddington
List of New South Wales state by-elections

Notes

References

1919 elections in Australia
New South Wales state by-elections
1910s in New South Wales